The 1960 All England Championships was a badminton tournament held at Wembley, London, England, from 16–20 March 1960.

The ladies champion Heather Ward moved to South Africa and did not defend her title.

Final results

Results

Men's singles

Section 1

Section 2

Women's singles

Section 1

Section 2

+ seeded player

References

All England Open Badminton Championships
All England
All England Open Badminton Championships in London
All England Badminton Championships
All England Badminton Championships
All England Badminton Championships